Hugh McLaughlin (born 2 September 1943) is a Scottish retired professional footballer who played in the Football League for Brentford as a wing half.

Career

Brentford 
McLaughlin began his career at Scottish junior club St Roch's and was signed by Scottish manager Malky McDonald of English Third Division club Brentford in September 1961. McLaughlin made only seven first team appearances during a five-year spell at Griffin Park and scored once, in a League Cup match versus Reading in September 1963. After substitutions were introduced in the Football League in 1965, McLaughlin was the first Brentford player to come on as a substitute, when he replaced Billy Cobb after 41 minutes of a 2–0 win over Oldham Athletic on 11 April 1964. McLaughlin spent much of his time in the Brentford reserves and won the 1964–65 London Challenge Cup with the team. McLaughlin departed Griffin Park at the end of the 1965–66 season.

Gravesend & Northfleet 
After his release from Brentford, McLaughlin dropped into non-League football and signed for Southern League First Division club Gravesend & Northfleet prior to the beginning of the 1966–67 season.

Personal life 
McLaughlin's grandnephew Aaron Hickey also became a professional footballer and signed for Brentford in 2022.

Career statistics

Honours 
Brentford Reserves
 London Challenge Cup: 1964–65

References

1943 births
Footballers from Glasgow
Scottish footballers
Brentford F.C. players
St Roch's F.C. players
English Football League players
Ebbsfleet United F.C. players
Southern Football League players
Association football wing halves
Living people
Scottish Junior Football Association players